The 1887–88 British Home Championship was the fifth edition of the annual international football tournament played between the British Home Nations. It was the first edition of the tournament in which Scotland did not at least share in the trophy and was also notable for a record flood of goals, 46 in six games, 26 of them conceded by Ireland, who suffered a disastrous competition.

England began the tournament in the same vein as they finished it, winning the opening match 5–1 against Wales at the Alexandra Recreation Ground in Crewe. Wales responded to this, and to their shock defeat by Ireland the year previously with an 11–0 thrashing of the visiting Irish, a Welsh record scoreline which remains standing after  years. Any hopes of a recovery for the Welsh were however dashed in their final game when Scotland administered a 5–1 beating in Edinburgh.

England returned to the fray and gained revenge for their narrow defeat in the deciding match of the previous year when they in turn thrashed Scotland 5–0 in Glasgow, leaving only the weak Irish in between them and the trophy. Before this however, Ireland received another massive defeat at the hands of Scotland, who beat them 2–10 in Belfast to take second place. In the final game, England needed only a draw to secure the title but managed a win by five goals to one to take their first undisputed championship.

Table

Results

Winning squad

References

Brit
Brit
Brit
Brit
Home Championship
British Home Championships